Marxist Working Group (in Swedish: Marxistisk Arbetsgrupp) was a left communist group in Sweden. The group emerged from a split in the VPK branch of Birka-Vasa in 1974. Since the late 1960s a section of the Birka-Vasa branch had developed left communist leanings. By 1974 they broke away, and the majority of them joined MA. Many had been part of the branch board of VPK Birka-Vasa 1969-1974.

MA existed parallel to Workers Power League (Förbundet Arbetarmakt), another left communist group in Sweden at the time.

MA published För Kommunismen. After three numbers the publication was discontinued, but in 1979 a fourth edition was published. That number included platforms and contact addresses of the International Communist Current, Communist Workers Organisation and Pour une Intervention Communiste. When the ICC formed a branch in Sweden in 1980, MA members joined it. Former MA members were also found in the group that published Arbetarpress.

There was also a Marxistiska Arbetsgruppen in Hägersten around 1970. That group was put under surveillance by SÄPO.

Sources 
För Kommunismen, nr. 4, May 1979.
Arbetarmakt 11-75

SOU

External links
För Kommunismen marxists.org
1974 establishments in Sweden
Communist organizations in Sweden
Defunct organizations based in Sweden
Left communism
Organizations established in 1974
Political organizations based in Sweden